Judo competitions at the 2024 Summer Olympics in Paris are scheduled to run from 27 July to 3 August at Grand Palais Éphémère in Champ de Mars. The number of judokas competing across fourteen different weight categories at these Games has been gradually trimmed from 386 in Tokyo 2020 to 372, with an equal distribution between men and women. Despite the slight changes in athlete figures, the judo program for Paris 2024 remains constant from the previous editions, as the competition will feature an equal number of bodyweight classes for men and women, with seven each, and the return of the mixed team tournament for the second time, an event introduced three years earlier in Tokyo.

Competition format 
The judo program features a total of fourteen bodyweight classes, seven each for both men and women. Regularly starting on the first day of the competition, a single men's and women's weight category will occur each day before the program concludes with the mixed team tournament (scheduled for 3 August).

In each weight category, athletes are seeded in a single-elimination bracket, a traditional knock-out format until the final with a slight twist. Those defeated in the quarterfinals will remain in the competition with a repechage draw resulting to double bronze-medal matches awarded to the judokas.

The mixed-team tournament, an event introduced in the previous edition, features a squad of six individual judokas with three weight categories per gender competing against another team. To win every match, the team must score four victories out of six rounds.

Since the previous edition, several rule changes are instituted to empower the judo program for Paris 2024 and subsequent Summer Olympic editions. Based on the 2016 IJF rule changes, the game time for men have shortened to a minute, and the length of a game becomes four minutes similar to the women's side. The waza-ari scores remain constant from Tokyo 2020, requiring a judoka to pin his or her opponent between the ten and twenty-second limit, or to throw the opponent successfully but not well-controlled to be awarded as ippon. According to the fundamental judo rules, any athlete can win in a tripartite pathway: 1) to throw the opponent to the ground at a certain efficiency, 2) to hold down the opponent for 20 seconds, and 3) to force the opponent to a submission by arm lock or to strangulation. Originally, scoring an ippon ends the game but the waza-aris are now equally awarded to an ippon in the competition. With this rule change, penalty scores are no longer recorded to end the match.

Qualification

Competition schedule

Medal summary

Medal table

Men's events

Women's events

Mixed events

See also
Judo at the 2022 Asian Games
Judo at the 2023 Pan American Games

References

 
2024
2024 Summer Olympics events
Olympics
Olympics
Olympics 2024